Nikolai Averyanov may refer to:

 Nikolai Aleksandrovich Averyanov (born 1989), Russian footballer
 Nikolay Averyanov (decathlete) (born 1980), Russian decathlete